"The Tholian Web" is the ninth episode of the third season of the American science fiction television series Star Trek. Written by Judy Burns and Chet Richards and directed by Herb Wallerstein, it was first broadcast on November 15, 1968.

In the episode, Captain Kirk is caught between dimensions while the crew of the Enterprise works to retrieve him. All the while, the Tholians are weaving a destructive energy web around the Enterprise.

Plot
The starship USS Enterprise enters an uncharted region of space searching for her sister ship, the USS Defiant. Sensors detect fractures in space, and a power loss affects all systems. Defiant is found adrift, and Captain Kirk, First Officer Spock, Chief Medical Officer Dr. McCoy, and Navigator Ensign Chekov transport across wearing environmental suits for protection. Aboard Defiant, they find the crew dead, apparently having killed one another.

The boarding party discovers that Defiant is slowly fading out of our universe. At one point, McCoy passes his hand through an almost invisible man and a table. With limited transporter functionality due to the unexplained malfunctions, Kirk orders his men to return to Enterprise first. The beaming takes longer than usual, and as Chief Engineer Scott tries to beam Kirk aboard, the Defiant vanishes.

Spock determines that the local space is experiencing periods of "interphase", when two parallel dimensions touch each other and objects in one can move to the other, and believes Kirk will reappear during the next one. As he explains the situation, Chekov lashes out in anger, a symptom that McCoy believes is due to their proximity to Defiant. Spock, however, refuses to move the ship, fearful of disrupting local space, which could result in the loss of the Captain.

With two hours before the next interphase, the Enterprise is approached by a small, unfamiliar ship. Its captain, Commander Loskene of the Tholian Assembly, asserts that Enterprise has violated Tholian space and must leave. Spock persuades Loskene to wait one hour and fifty-three minutes. When the time is up, Kirk does not reappear, and Spock concludes that the arrival of the Tholian ship disrupted the interphase.

When the Enterprise is attacked by Loskene, McCoy again urges Spock to leave, believing Kirk is lost. Spock chooses to return fire and the Tholian ship is disabled, but the Enterprise takes damage as well. Scott warns that because of the damage he cannot guarantee that he can hold their position. A second Tholian ship joins the first, and the two begin weaving an energy web that cages the Enterprise. Spock determines that if the web is completed before repairs are done, they will be unable to escape.

Spock conducts a memorial service for Kirk, during which another man goes insane. Spock and McCoy then view a tape left by Kirk, to be played in the event of his death, which implores the two of them to work together for the benefit of the ship. Lieutenant Uhura and Scott both report seeing ghostly manifestations of Kirk. Finally, the apparition is seen on the bridge; Kirk is still in his environmental suit and appears to be urging Spock to "hurry".

With the Tholian web nearly complete, McCoy dispenses an antidote to the effects of the local space, and Spock determines the time of Kirk's next appearance. They lock onto Kirk's coordinates, and Spock orders the activation of the ship's engines, which carries them through the spatial rift to a point 2.72 parsecs away. Kirk is brought along by the transporter lock, and beamed aboard just as his oxygen runs out.

On the bridge, Kirk questions Spock and McCoy about their handling of the emergency, particularly concerning the tape with his final orders. McCoy claims they did not have time to watch it, Spock confirms that they were very busy, and Kirk accepts their answers.

Subsequent appearances

In a two-part episode of Star Trek: Enterprise called "In a Mirror, Darkly", it is revealed that the Defiant has reappeared in the Mirror Universe of Archer's time, where it is first salvaged by the Tholians and then stolen by the Terran Empire.

Reception
In 2015, SyFy ranked this episode as one of the top ten essential Star Trek original series Spock episodes.

In 2016, The Hollywood Reporter rated "The Tholian Web" the 75th best television episode of all Star Trek franchise television shows prior to Star Trek: Discovery.

A 2018 Star Trek binge-watching guide by Den of Geek, recommended this episode for featuring the trio of characters Kirk, Spock, and Bones of the original series.

Popular culture
In 1997 it became known that United States Customs investigators had used the name "Tholian Web" for a technique for embroiling child porn enthusiasts in internet conversations to trick them into illegal activity.  
By 1997 it had triggered hundreds of prosecutions.

In 2010 Gerry W. Beyer, of the Texas Tech University School of Law, cited a video recording introduced in this episode, which Captain Kirk, Captain of the starship Enterprise, had left for his two most senior officers to play in the event of his death, urging them to overcome their personal animosity.
Beyer described this fictional recording as one of the first recorded instances of what he called a "video-will".

Political scientists have compared the metaphor of the entrapment in this episode with the deep challenges politicians and administrators feel when confronted with competing factions and lobby groups.

Home video 
"The Tholian Web" was released in 1988 on LaserDisc in the United States. It was published by Paramount Home Video, and was released as a pair with "For the World Is Hollow and I Have Touched the Sky". Star Trek titles were popular on the growing home video market in the 1980s, and the Star Trek II film had helped establish the home video market.

This episode was released in Japan on December 21, 1993 as part of the complete season 3 LaserDisc set, Star Trek: Original Series log.3. A trailer for this and the other episodes was also included on an additional disc, and the episode had English and Japanese audio tracks. The cover script was スター・トレック TVサードシーズン for the set.

References

External links

 

 "The Tholian Web" Remastered FX reel at TrekMovie.com

Star Trek: The Original Series (season 3) episodes
1968 American television episodes
Mirror Universe (Star Trek) episodes
Television episodes directed by Herb Wallerstein